Cacique is a corregimiento in Portobelo District, Colón Province, Panama with a population of 246 as of 2010. Its population as of 1990 was 225; its population as of 2000 was 268.

References

Corregimientos of Colón Province